Viney Grove (formerly Vineygrove) is an unincorporated community in Marrs Hill Township, Washington County, Arkansas, United States. It is located north of Prairie Grove and Prairie Grove Battlefield State Park along County Road 37.

A post office was established at Viney Grove in 1870, and remained in operation until 1905.

References

Unincorporated communities in Washington County, Arkansas
Unincorporated communities in Arkansas